Montgomery Street station (often Montgomery station) is a combined BART and Muni Metro rapid transit station in the Market Street subway in downtown San Francisco. Located under Market Street between Montgomery Street and Sansome Street, it serves the Financial District neighborhood and surrounding areas. The three-level station has a large fare mezzanine level, with separate platform levels for Muni Metro and BART below. With over 9,000 boardings per weekday, Montgomery Street and Embarcadero station to the north are the two busiest stations in the BART system.

Station layout

Like the three other shared Muni/BART stations in the Market Street subway, Montgomery has three underground levels. The first level is a fare mezzanine, with two Muni paid areas and two BART paid areas. The second level has a single island platform for Muni Metro, and the third level has an island platform for BART. The station has seven street entrances along its length, plus underground entrances to the One Sansome Street and 44 Montgomery buildings.

History

The under-construction station was featured in the 1971 film The Organization. BART service at the station began on November 5, 1973, followed by Muni Metro service on February 18, 1980.

Prior to the COVID-19 pandemic, some morning rush-hour trains on the Antioch line short turned at Montgomery to provide additional Transbay service. From February 16, 2020, to September 20, 2020, and again from March 22, 2021 to August 1, 2021, Dublin/Pleasanton line trains terminated at Montgomery on some Sundays due to single-tracking in the Market Street Subway.

Following the 2015 addition of a canopy over an escalator at 19th Street Oakland station, which reduced escalator downtime by one-third, BART decided to add canopies to all downtown Oakland and San Francisco entrances. Construction of the Market Street entrances at Montgomery station began in February 2021, with the New Montgomery Street entrance closed on January 3, 2022. Completion is expected in 2027.  

The entrances on the southern side of the station were closed from April 13, 2020, to May 15, 2021, due to low ridership during the COVID-19 pandemic. On September 13, 2021, the center portion of the mezzanine level and the southern entrance east of 2nd Street were closed for construction of a BART traction power substation. The entrance and mezzanine passage are expected to reopen in 2023.

Bathrooms at underground BART stations were closed after the September 11 attacks in 2001 due to security concerns. The bathroom at Montgomery station reopened on June 28, 2022, after a renovation, with an attendant on duty during all operating hours.

Under the planned Better Market Street project, the inbound F stop would be discontinued to reduce travel times.

Connections

Muni's F Market and Wharves heritage streetcar line stops on the surface at Market and 2nd Street (outbound) and Market and New Montgomery (inbound). The station is also served by a number of Muni bus and trolleybus routes:

AC Transit serves Montgomery Street station with the 800 All Nighter route during hours that BART is not operating.

Additional Muni, Golden Gate Transit (30, 70, 101, 101X), and SamTrans (292, 397, 398, FCX) bus routes run on Mission Street, one block away.

References

External links

BART: Montgomery St. Station
SFMTA: Montgomery Station inbound, outbound
SF Bay Transit (unofficial): MUNI Metro Montgomery Station, Montgomery St. BART Station

Bay Area Rapid Transit stations in San Francisco
Stations on the Yellow Line (BART)
Stations on the Green Line (BART)
Stations on the Red Line (BART)
Stations on the Blue Line (BART)
Muni Metro stations
Financial District, San Francisco
Market Street (San Francisco)
Railway stations in the United States opened in 1973
1973 establishments in California
Railway stations located underground in California